Policing: An International Journal of Police Strategies & Management is a quarterly peer-reviewed academic journal covering the study of policing. It was established in 1978 as Police Studies: International Review of Police Development, and obtained its current name in 1997, when it was merged with the American Journal of Police. It is published by Emerald Group Publishing, and the editors-in-chief are Lorie Fridell and Wesley Jennings (University of South Florida). According to the Journal Citation Reports, the journal has a 2016 impact factor of  0.646.

References

External links

Emerald Group Publishing academic journals
Policing journals
Publications established in 1978
Quarterly journals
English-language journals